Özgür Uyanık is a writer and film director.

Early life and education
Uyanık was born in Turkey and raised in the United Kingdom, where his parents migrated in 1980. He attended the University of Kent at Canterbury, graduating with a degree in Communications and Image Studies.

Career
He began his career in the film industry after graduation. He has written and directed award-winning short films and ad campaigns, including Oblivious (2001), starring Sienna Guillory, which won Best European Short Film at the Brussels European Film Festival as well as being short-listed for a BAFTA and sold to Universal Sci-Fi Channel and Canal+ International for several territories.

The 2010 Kaleidoscope release Resurrecting: The Street Walker is Uyanık's feature film debut as writer-director. It was nominated for Best UK Feature at the Raindance Film Festival and was official selection at the International Istanbul Film Festival, FAB Edinburgh Horror Film Festival, the Festival of Fantastic Film Manchester, Dublin Horrorthon, Abertoir Horror Film Festival in Wales, Belgium's Razor Reel and the Haapsalu Horror & Fantasy Film Festival.

Holy Men, his second feature-length film project, was selected for the 2014–2015 Binger Filmlab Writer's Lab in Amsterdam, Netherlands.

References

External links
 
 

Living people
Year of birth missing (living people)
Turkish film directors
Place of birth missing (living people)